Nikolay Baranov (born 17 March 1960 in Kremenchuk, Ukrainian SSR) was a Soviet sprint canoeist who competed in the early 1980s. He won four medals at the ICF Canoe Sprint World Championships with three golds (K-4 10000 m: 1981, 1982, 1983) and a silver (K-4 1000 m: 1981).

References

Living people
People from Kremenchuk
Ukrainian male canoeists
Soviet male canoeists
1960 births
ICF Canoe Sprint World Championships medalists in kayak
Honoured Masters of Sport of the USSR
Sportspeople from Poltava Oblast